Khafung is a constituency located in the Berea District of Lesotho. The population in 2006 was 25,660.

Villages

Ha TšekeloHa MotsoaoleHa MosetheHa MosoeunyaneHa MokhehleHa MonnanyaneHa RapopoHa LibenyaneHa RamachineHa Chaba
Ha TšoeunyaneHa PhiriHa LebinaHa PhoofoloHa MokhethiHa MosobelaHa RamoteteLipatolongSebala-BalaHa Morolong
Ha NtebeleKoloneMamatheCanaPaballongHa MamatheHa LeneaHa SeokaHa Lenea (Ha Mamathe)Ha Malesela
TilimanengKhalahaliHa MphetlaneThota-PeliHa JaneHa MatseleliHa PhalatsaneHa RantungHa KholopaneHa Hlaonyane

References

Populated places in Berea District